Gibberula grafae is a species of sea snail, a marine gastropod mollusk, in the family Cystiscidae. It is named after German tennis player Steffi Graf.

Distribution
This species occurs in Guadeloupe.

References

grafae
Gastropods described in 2015